The Goldstream River is a tributary of the Columbia River, joining that stream via the Lake Revelstoke reservoir after running largely west from the heart of the northern Selkirk Mountains.  The river's name derives from the Big Bend Gold Rush of 1865, during which it was the scene of busy prospecting and mining activities and as one of the centres of the rush.

See also
Tributaries of the Columbia River
List of British Columbia rivers

References

Rivers of British Columbia
Tributaries of the Columbia River
Columbia Country
Columbia Mountains
Kootenay Land District